The Harborough Citizen was a free newspaper with a circulation of 10,000 launched in April 2006. It was distributed to homes in the town of Market Harborough and some surrounding villages. Generally, it features a story on the front that will also appear in the Harborough Mail on Thursday. It also included puzzle pages and was used to promote competitions due to appear in the Harborough Mail that week, as the Citizen was delivered to homes on a Tuesday or Wednesday while the Mail would be on news stands on a Thursday.

In February 2010 the Citizen, which is produced by the same team involved with the Harborough Mail, was placed on hiatus, although not officially cancelled, until further notice.

Newspapers published in Leicestershire
Market Harborough